All Nepal National Free Students Union may refer to:

 All Nepal National Free Students Union (UML) 
 All Nepal National Free Students Union (Unified Socialist)
 All Nepal National Free Students Union (Sixth) 
 All Nepal National Independent Students' Union (Revolutionary)
 All Nepal National Independent Students Union (Unified)